Andrew or Andy Webster may refer to:

 Andrew Webster (cricketer) (born 1959), English cricketer
 Andy Webster (footballer, born 1947), English footballer
 Andy Webster (footballer, born 1982), Scottish footballer
 Andrew Webster (rugby league) (born 1982), Australian rugby league player and coach
 Andrew Webster (sociologist) (1951–2021), English sociologist